Richard Paul McCabe (March 12, 1933 – January 4, 1983) was an American football safety who played college football at the University of Pittsburgh.  McCabe played in the National Football League (NFL) for the Pittsburgh Steelers and the Washington Redskins.  He also played in the American Football League (AFL) for the Buffalo Bills, making the Sporting News' AFL All-League team in 1960.  He finished his playing career with the Bills in 1961, but he returned to the team in 1966 as defensive backfield coach. He was born in Pittsburgh, Pennsylvania.

See also
 List of American Football League players

References

1933 births
1983 deaths
American football safeties
Buffalo Bills players
Buffalo Bills coaches
Cleveland Browns coaches
Pittsburgh Panthers football players
Pittsburgh Steelers players
Washington Redskins players
American Football League All-League players
American Football League All-Star players
Sportspeople from Pittsburgh
Deaths from cancer in Colorado
American Football League players
Players of American football from Pittsburgh